Nasim Ferdous is a former Bangladeshi career diplomat. She joined the foreign service in 1977. She is the first women to enter in foreign service in Bangladesh. She served as an ambassador to Indonesia from 2002 to 2006. She retired from the service in 2008.

She is also an executive director of Bangladesh Alliance for Women Leadership (BDAWL) and chairperson of the Home Economics Association.

References 

Living people
Bangladeshi women ambassadors
Ambassadors of Bangladesh to Indonesia
Year of birth missing (living people)